Robert Andrew Voss  (born 9 February 1953) is a British businessman in the metals industry. Voss was appointed Lord Lieutenant of Hertfordshire to replace the Countess of Verulam.

References 

Living people
Lord-Lieutenants of Hertfordshire
Commanders of the Order of the British Empire
1953 births